|}

The German 1,000 Guineas is a Group 2 flat horse race in Germany open to three-year-old thoroughbred fillies. It is run at Düsseldorf over a distance of 1,600 metres (about 1 mile), and it is scheduled to take place each year in June.

It is Germany's equivalent of the 1,000 Guineas Stakes, a famous race in England.

History
The event was established in 1919, and it was originally called the Kisasszony-Rennen. It was initially held at Grunewald, and it moved to Hoppegarten in 1923.

The race was renamed the Schwarzgold-Rennen in 1941, in honour of the previous year's winner Schwarzgold. It was cancelled in 1945 and 1946, and it was staged at Cologne and Krefeld in the two years thereafter. It was transferred to Düsseldorf in 1949.

The present system of race grading was introduced in Germany in 1972, and the Schwarzgold-Rennen was classed at Group 3 level. It was promoted to Group 2 status in 1985. The race became known as the ARAG-Preis in 1989, and as the Henkel-Rennen in 1997. It has been run under several different titles since 2006.

Records
Leading jockey (5 wins):
 Otto Schmidt – Petunie (1924), Faustina (1926), Burgbrohl (1927), Ausnahme (1929), Ausflucht (1933)
 Peter Remmert – Alte Liebe (1964), Ankerwinde (1972), Leticia (1980), Majorität (1987), Alte Zeit (1988)

Leading trainer (12 wins):
 Heinz Jentzsch – Brisanz (1962), Bravour (1966), Schönbrunn (1969), Brigida (1975), Licata (1976), Aviatik (1977), Ocana (1978), Leticia (1980), Opium (1982), Slenderella (1984), Comprida (1986), Quebrada (1993)

Leading owner (9 wins):
 Gestüt Schlenderhan – Schwarzgold (1940), Vivere (1942), Aralia (1948), Asterblüte (1949), Bella Donna (1954), Schönbrunn (1969), Brigida (1975), Aviatik (1977), Slenderella (1984)

Winners since 1968

Earlier winners

 1919: Tulipan
 1920: Romanze
 1921: Kamille
 1922: Casa Bianca
 1923: Ischida
 1924: Petunie
 1925: Melanie
 1926: Faustina
 1927: Burgbrohl
 1928: Contessa Maddalena
 1929: Ausnahme
 1930: Stromschnelle
 1931: Sichel
 1932: Alemannia
 1933: Ausflucht
 1934: Schwarzliesel
 1935: Dornrose
 1936: Nereide
 1937: Iniga Isolani
 1938: Hannenalt
 1939: Tatjana
 1940: Schwarzgold
 1941: Beresina / Farida *
 1942: Vivere
 1943: Mainkur
 1944: Träumerei
 1945–46: no race
 1947: Königswiese
 1948: Aralia
 1949: Asterblüte
 1950: Gitana
 1951: Muskatblüte
 1952: Königstreue
 1953: Naxos
 1954: Bella Donna
 1955: Silver City
 1956: Liebeslied
 1957: Thila
 1958: Ivresse
 1959: Wiesenblüte
 1960: Santa Cruz
 1961: Alisma
 1962: Brisanz
 1963: Lis
 1964: Alte Liebe
 1965: Tigerin
 1966: Bravour
 1967: Landeskrone

* The 1941 race was a dead-heat and has joint winners.

See also

 List of German flat horse races
 Recurring sporting events established in 1919  – this race is included under its original title, Kisasszony-Rennen.

References
 Racing Post:

 galopp-sieger.de – Deutsche 1000 Guineas.
 horseracingintfed.com – International Federation of Horseracing Authorities – German 1000 Guineas (2016).
 pedigreequery.com – Henkel-Rennen (Deutsches 1000 Guineas) – Düsseldorf.

Flat horse races for three-year-old fillies
Horse races in Germany
Recurring sporting events established in 1919
1919 establishments in Germany
Sport in Düsseldorf